The following is a list of most expensive basketball transfers, which presents the 20 highest fees ever paid for players as of the end of the summer of 2015.

The list contains a few transfers which broke the world transfer record: those of Antonello Riva, Stefano Rusconi, Dino Rađa, Dino Meneghin, all broke the record, signing for Italian clubs and a Greek club. The list also features two players who, at the time of the transfer, broke the national record for the club they were signing for: Ricky Rubio and Milan Gurović.

Highest fees
Most high-value transfers involve clubs in the Eurozone. The order in this table is based on the transfer amount in euros. Due to exchange rate fluctuations the order is different in former Italian lira, which is also shown in the table.
''As of 1 November 2015;

See also

List of most expensive American soccer transfers
List of most expensive association football transfers
List of most expensive Australian rules football transfers
List of most expensive Baseball transfers
List of most expensive Cricket transfers
List of most expensive Ice hockey transfers
List of most expensive rugby league transfers
List of most expensive rugby union transfers

References

External links
http://www.marca.com/2009/08/26/baloncesto/1251291113.html
http://www.marca.com/2009/08/26/baloncesto/1251306846.html
http://www.marca.com/2009/08/26/baloncesto/acb/1251278631.html
https://web.archive.org/web/20140126025907/http://www.basketlive.it/articoli/lega-a-basket/hackett-a-milano-e-gia-storia-i-trasferimenti-piu-grossi-del-basket-italiano/

Transfers
Basketball transfers
Basketball transfers